Tamkeen is Arabic for enablement and empowerment.

 Tamkeen Industrial and Trading Company, also called Tamkeen Group, a business based in Saudi Arabia.
 Tamkeen (Bahrain), a semi-government organisation in Bahrain.